Marcel DeBellis (born 17 April 1991) is a retired Canadian professional soccer player and current Category Manager of Beler Holdings Inc (BHI).

Professional

Ottawa Fury 

DeBellis was the first goalkeeper signing for the Ottawa Fury in January 2014. After spending the majority of his first two years in Ottawa as a backup to Romuald Peiser, he made his professional debut in October 2015 against the Atlanta Silverbacks. In July 2016, DeBellis made his first start of the 2016 NASL season against Rayo OKC after Peiser picked up a red card in the previous week's game against the New York Cosmos. In December 2016, the Fury announced that de Bellis would not return to the team as the club moved to USL in 2017. He played a match for their academy team in the third-tier Première Ligue de soccer du Québec.

Richmond Kickers 

DeBellis signed with Richmond Kickers of the USL for the 2017 season.

Career statistics

References

External links
Ottawa Fury profile

1991 births
Living people
Canadian soccer players
Association football goalkeepers
Canadian people of Italian descent
Soccer people from Ontario
Sportspeople from Oakville, Ontario
Canadian expatriate soccer players
Expatriate footballers in Portugal
Expatriate footballers in Italy
Canadian expatriate sportspeople in Portugal
Canadian expatriate sportspeople in Italy
S.L. Benfica footballers
A.C. Bellaria Igea Marina players
Ascoli Calcio 1898 F.C. players
Ottawa Fury FC players
North American Soccer League players